The sixth season of the Chinese reality talent show Sing! China premiered on 30 July 2021, on Zhejiang Television. Li Ronghao returned as coach for his third consecutive season. Former coach Wang Feng returned to the coaching panel after a four-season hiatus. Na Ying also returned after a one-season hiatus, but only as a coach during the blind auditions and was later replaced by Liao Changyong. They brought along Hacken Lee who is a new coach this season, replacing Li Jian, Nicholas Tse and Chris Li from the previous season.

On 15 October 2021, Wu Keyue was announced the winner of the season, marking Hacken Lee's first win as coach. Wang Jingwen, Chen Wenfei, Yao Xiaotang, and Kazu finished runner-up, third, fourth, and fifth places, respectively. With Keyue's win, she is the first person to receive all turns from coaches in the blind auditions and win the competition. Additionally, for the first time in the show's history, all finalists were female.

Coaches and hosts

Only Li Ronghao returned from the previous season. Li Jian did not return for Season 6, making room for the return of Wang Feng after a four-season hiatus. Na Ying also returned after being absent from the previous season. However, she only participated in the blind auditions, leading to Liao Changyong replacing her afterwards. These coaches were joined by first-time coach Hacken Lee. Therefore, Nicholas Tse and Li Yuchun have been confirmed to leave the show. The host remained the same as last season.

Teams
 Colour key

Blind auditions

This season introduces teaching assistants. Coaches Na Ying, Wang Feng, Li Ronghao and Hacken Lee will team up with assistants Zhang Bichen, Huang Xiaoyun, Jike Junyi and Momo Wu respectively. Teaching Assistants function like normal coaches. However, when it comes to recruiting contestants, the final decision is up to the coach on whether or not they want the contestant on their team. In other words, the contestant cannot be recruited to their team unless the coach presses their button. If the teaching assistant pressed their button but not their coach counterpart, then the coach has the last 30 seconds to decide if they want the contestant after the song finishes. While there is a 30 second countdown, if the teaching assistant is really impressed by an artist's performance, they can choose to use their Instant Recruit ability. This means that the teaching assistant can press their button again, causing the chair's voice system to say "I WANT YOU" and the respective coach to instantly turn around. This also makes their team available for the artist to choose. However, this action can only be done once per team.

In this stage, the coaches are to recruit a total of six artists to form a team of their own, contrary to five in the previous season. The forming of the teams would move to a format that is similar to the "Six-Chair Challenge" featured in the British version of The X Factor. Once a team is full with six artists occupying all the spots, the subsequent artists which the coach has successfully recruited would have to face-off with one of the six artists in the sing-offs for a spot in the team. 

The incoming artist may select any of the six defending artists to compete against in the sing-off, and both artists would each sing a new song and the coach would decide on the winner. The winner would be given the spot in the team. However, continuing from last season, the losing artist has the chance to be saved by other coaches (the same function as the steals from The Voice. The coaches are given 10 seconds to save the losing artist for elimination. If one coach presses their button, he/she will be automatically on the new coach's team and if more than one coach presses, same as with the blind auditions, the artist has the opportunity to choose which coach they want. 

For defending artists, once they have won a sing-off against an incoming artist, they would receive immunity from the subsequent sing-offs and immediately advance to the next round of the competition.

 Colour key

Episode 1 (30 July)

Episode 2 (6 August)

Episode 3 (13 August)

Episode 4 (20 August)

Episode 5 (27 August)

Episode 6 (3 September)

Sing-off details

The Cross Battles
In this round, each coach will compete against each other in groups of two. Artists from these respective teams will compete each other in six rounds to decide a winner. The winning artist will receive one point for their team while the other artist will not receive any points. However, if the coach uses the bonus point into the artist and won, the artist will receive two points for their team; otherwise, the artist will not receive any points.

At the end of the episode, the team that achieved a lower score will have to eliminate one artist from their team as a penalty.

After participating in the Blind Auditions this season, Na Ying decided to leave the show and was replaced by Liao Changyong.

 Colour key

The Cross Knockouts
In this round, coaches will draw to determine when they will have the power to choose first. That coach will choose an artist from his team and state which opposing team he wants that artist to face off against. The chosen artist from the representative team will decide his/her opponent by draw as well. Each coach is allowed one block in this round. If a coach used a "Block" on his artist, he/she may not face a certain artist from another team by default. At the end of each Cross Knockout, the two artists will receive votes of approval from a 51-person judging panel. The artist with the most votes will advance to the Playoffs, while the other would be eliminated.

 Colour key

The Playoffs
The Top 11 performed in the Playoffs for a spot in the Top 8. The order of appearance of the artists was decided through the drawing of lots by their respective coaches. In deciding who moves on, a professional judging panel made up of 51 veteran record producers, music critics, and media practitioners from various media companies; as well as the studio audience made up of 200 members of the public were given an equal say. Each of the voters was entitled to one vote per artist, and they can either choose to vote or not vote for a particular artist. The maximum score that the student will receive of the professional judging panel review is 51, and 50 for the live audiences, thus having the maximum score of was 101. Eight artists with higher overall scores advanced, while the other three will be eliminated.

The Semi-finals
The Top 8 performed in the semi-finals for a slot in the finals. Just like in the playoffs, the order of appearance of the artists was decided through the drawing of lots by their respective coaches. The same voting procedure in the playoffs will be done in the semi-finals: a 51-member professional judging panel, as well as 200-member public. Five artists with higher overall scores will advance to the final, while the other three will be eliminated. With Wang Jingwen and Kazu's advancement to the final, this is the second instance that a stolen artist advanced to the finale. This is also the first time that more than one stolen artist advanced to the finale Coincidentally, this is the second consecutive season that Li Ronghao managed to advance a stolen artist to the finale. Also, with the elimination of Wang Honghao 王泓昊, this is the first time in the show's history where no male singers are represented in the finale.

The Finals

Elimination chart

Color key 
Artist's info

  Team Wang Feng
  Team Liao Changyong 
  Team Li Ronghao
  Team Hacken Lee 

Result details

    Winner
  Runner-up
  Third place
  Fourth place
  Fifth place
  Saved by public 
  Eliminated

Overall

Contestants who appeared on previous seasons or TV shows
 Tan Xuanyuan was in Season 4 of the original show The Voice of China and was on Team Harlem, where he landed third place in the Finals.
 Yu Zibei previously appeared in the second season on Team Eason. She was eliminated in the Knockout rounds.
 Huang He was in Season 1 of the original show under Na Ying's team, and was eliminated in the battles
 Step.jad competed in the show Rap for Youth and was part of the Top 34
 Sha Nanjie competed in the third season of Sing My Song under Liu Huan's team, and was eliminated in the battle stage.
 Rob Caiwang was a contestant in the first season of The Coming One, where he placed 9th.

References

2021 in Chinese music
2021 Chinese television seasons